The Roman Catholic Diocese of Kandi is a diocese located in the city of Kandi in the Ecclesiastical province of Parakou in Benin.

History
 19 December 1994: Established as Diocese of Kandi from the Diocese of Parakou

Leadership
 Bishops of Kandi (Roman rite), in reverse chronological order
 Bishop Clet Feliho: since 29 January 2000
 Bishop Marcel Honorat Léon Agboton: 19 December 1994  – 29 January 2000, appointed Bishop of Porto Novo; future Archbishop of  Cotonou

See also
 Roman Catholicism in Benin

References

External links
 GCatholic.org 

Roman Catholic dioceses in Benin
Christian organizations established in 1994
Roman Catholic dioceses and prelatures established in the 20th century
Kandi, Roman Catholic Diocese of